Group 5 consisted of five of the 34 teams entered into the European zone: Denmark, Greece, Italy, Luxembourg, and Yugoslavia. These five teams competed on a home-and-away basis for two of the 14 spots in the final tournament allocated to the European zone, with the group's winner and runner-up claiming those spots.

Standings

Results

Notes

External links 
Group 5 Detailed Results at RSSSF

5
1980 in Danish football
1981 in Danish football
1980–81 in Greek football
1981–82 in Greek football
1980–81 in Italian football
1981–82 in Italian football
1980–81 in Luxembourgian football
1981–82 in Luxembourgian football
1980–81 in Yugoslav football
1981–82 in Yugoslav football